Events from the year 1982 in South Korea.

Incumbents
President: Chun Doo-hwan
Prime Minister: 
 until 4 January: Nam Duck-woo 
 4 January-24 June: Yoo Chang-soon
 starting 24 June: Kim Sang-hyup

Events

Births
 2 January - Kim Ji-hyun, actress
 3 January - Park Ji-yoon, singer, actress and model
 4 January - Kang Hye-jung, actress and singer
 11 January - Son Ye-jin, actress
 15 January - Go Na-eun, actress
 17 January - Hwanhee, singer and actor
 26 January - KCM, singer
 28 January - Lee Yu-ri, actress
 1 February - Kim Jong-wook, singer
 2 February - Han Ga-in, actress
 2 February - Kan Mi-youn, singer, actress, radio host, model, fashion designer, and businesswoman
 5 February - Wheesung, R&B singer, record producer, and musical theatre actor
 11 February - Hwayobi, R&B singer-songwriter
 16 February - Lee Min-jung, actress
 20 February - Chang Kiha, singer-songwriter, actor and radio host
 1 March - Kim Min-hee, actress
 17 April - Lee Joon-gi, actor, singer, dancer, model
 17 April - Lee Si-young, actress, former amateur boxer
 3 May - Joo Hyun-Jung, archer
 10 May - Boom, singer, actor, radio host, and television presenter
 16 May - Ju Ji-hoon, actor, model
 18 May - Lim Ju-hwan, actor
 5 June - Yoo In-na, actress, DJ
 25 June - Rain, singer-songwriter, actor, and music producer
 30 July - Kim Min-jung, actress
 4 August - Jeon Mi-do, actress
 25 August - Jung Jung-suk, footballer
 23 September - Lee Ha-na, actress
 25 September - Hyun Bin, actor
 13 October - Jo Yoon-hee, actress
 18 October - Park Hyun-bin, singer
 5 November - Han Ji-min, actress
 7 November - Ivy, singer
 16 November - Lim Kyung-hee, athlete
 17 December - Song Won-geun, singer and actor

Deaths

27 April - Woo Bum-kon, policeman and mass murderer (b. 1955)
18 November - Kim Duk-koo, boxer (b. 1959)

See also
List of South Korean films of 1982
Years in Japan
Years in North Korea

References

 
Years of the 20th century in South Korea
1980s in South Korea